During and shortly after World War II the Royal Australian Air Force formed 13 Communication Units. These flight-sized units performed a wide range of support roles including transport, supplying isolated garrisons and supporting training. The Communication Units typically operated small numbers of several types of aircraft.

References
 RAAF Historical Section (1995), Units of the Royal Australian Air Force. A Concise History. Australian Government Publishing Service, Canberra.

Communication